Country Music Holiday is a 1958 American musical film directed by Alvin Ganzer and written by Harry Spalding. The film stars Ferlin Husky, Zsa Zsa Gabor, Rocky Graziano, Faron Young, Al Fisher, Lou Marks and June Carter Cash. The film was released in March 1958, by Paramount Pictures.

Plot

Cast 
Ferlin Husky as Verne Brand
Zsa Zsa Gabor as herself
Rocky Graziano as himself
Faron Young as Clyde Woods
Al Fisher as himself
Lou Marks as himself
June Carter Cash as Marietta 
Jesse White as Sonny Moon
Cliff Norton as Morty Chapman
Rod Brasfield as Pappy Brand
Hope Wainwright as 'Ma' Brand
Patty Duke as 'Sis' Brand
Art Ford as himself
Lew Parker as himself
The Jordanaires as themselves
Lonzo and Oscar as Comedy Team
Drifting Johnny Miller as himself
Ladell Sisters as themselves
Bernie Knee as Bernie

References

External links 
 

1958 films
Paramount Pictures films
American musical films
1958 musical films
1950s English-language films
Films directed by Alvin Ganzer
1950s American films